Spannabis is an annual cannabis event held in Spain that has been held in Barcelona since 2002. It is the biggest cannabis event in Europe.

In Spannabis you can find products related to the hemp plant, its industrial uses - cosmetics, footwear, textiles, building materials, food -, crops -bonds, seeds, farming systems, etc.-, recreational consumption and use as phytotherapy. In addition, lectures are given during the conference to discuss topics such as its use in herbal medicine, research on its active ingredients, cultivation and consumption, and risk reduction.

Sports Illustrated described the event as "part trade show, part research conference and 100% festival of copious cannabis consumption".

History 

At the beginning of the year 2001, a group of Spanish businessmen decided to adopt the idea of other fairs about hemp that were held in Europe. For several months they were looking for the site that hosted a contest of this type, seeking political support and the uncertainty of facing impediments to be a fair on a controversial plant.

In 2002, the first Spannabis was held at the Palau Sant Jordi. The second edition of Spannabis was held at the Fira de Cornellá, where it has been held ever since.

In 2011 Italian politicians protested against the celebration of Spannabis asking Spanish Prime Minister Zapatero for explanations.

During the following editions, Spannabis was consolidated and the exhibition space has been extended to reach 13,000 m2 until 2015 and in 2017 it has been expanded to reach 18,000 m2. There were 35,000 visitors in 2014 and 30,000 visitors in 2017 and 2018. In 2019 there were 282 companies represented.  The 6th edition of the World Cannabis Conferences took place on the Cannabis in 2019.

The 2020 Spannabis convention will be held in March 2022, as well as the 2022 World Cannabis Conference.

See also
 Cannabis in Spain

References

External links

 spannabis.com

Cannabis events
Cannabis in Spain